The Convention of Peking or First Convention of Peking is an agreement comprising three distinct treaties concluded between the Qing dynasty of China and Great Britain, France, and the Russian Empire in 1860. In China, they are regarded as among the unequal treaties.

Background
On 18 October 1860, at the culmination of the Second Opium War, the British and French troops entered the Forbidden City in Beijing.  Following the decisive defeat of the Chinese, Prince Gong was compelled to sign two treaties on behalf of the Qing government with Lord Elgin and Baron Gros, who represented Britain and France respectively. Although Russia had not been a belligerent, Prince Gong also signed a treaty with Nikolay Ignatyev.

The original plan was to burn down the Forbidden City as punishment for the mistreatment of Anglo-French prisoners by Qing officials.  Because doing so would jeopardize the treaty signing, the plan shifted to burning the Old Summer Palace and Summer Palace instead. The treaties with France and Britain were signed in the Ministry of Rites building immediately south of the Forbidden City on 24 October 1860.

Terms

In the convention, the Xianfeng Emperor ratified the Treaty of Tientsin (1858).

In 1860, the area known as Kowloon was originally negotiated for lease in March, but in few months' time, the Convention of Peking ended the lease, and ceded the land formally to the British on 24 October.

Article 6 of the Convention between China and the United Kingdom stipulated that China was to cede the part of Kowloon Peninsula south of present-day Boundary Street, Kowloon, and Hong Kong (including Stonecutters Island) in perpetuity to Britain.

Article 6 of the Convention between China and France stipulated that "the religious and charitable establishments which were confiscated from Christians during the persecutions of which they were victims shall be returned to their owners through the French Minister in China".

Manchuria 
The treaty also confirmed the cession the entirety of what is now known as Outer Manchuria to the Russian Empire, with Russia achieving the strategic goal of sealing off Chinese access to the Sea of Japan. It granted Russia the right to the Ussuri krai, a part of the modern day Primorye, the territory that corresponded with the ancient Manchu province of East Tartary. See Treaty of Aigun (1858), Treaty of Nerchinsk (1689) and Sino-Russian border conflicts.

In addition to ceding territory that had been ruled by the Qing dynasty, the treaty also ceded territory under Korean jurisdiction, notably the island (by that time and currently a peninsula at the southernmost end of Primorsky Krai) of Noktundo. This was not known to the Koreans until the 1880s (20 or so years after the signing of the treaty, to which Korea was not a party), at which point it became a matter of official protest as the Koreans asserted that the Qing had no authority to cede Noktundo to Russia.

Aftermath

Kowloon
The governments of the United Kingdom and the People's Republic of China (PRC) concluded the Sino-British Joint Declaration on the Question of Hong Kong in 1984, under which the sovereignty of the leased territories, together with Hong Kong Island, ceded under the Treaty of Nanking (1842), and Kowloon Peninsula (south of Boundary Street), was to be transferred to the PRC on 1 July 1997.

Noktundo
The status of Noktundo, which had been under Korean jurisdiction from the turn of the 17th century but was (unbeknownst to the Koreans until the 1880s) ceded to Russia in the treaty, remains formally unresolved, as only one of two Korean jurisdictions/governments have accepted a border agreement with Russia. North Korea and the USSR signed a border treaty in 1985 officially certifying the Russian-North Korean border as running through the center of the Tumen River which left the now-peninsula of Noktundo on the Russian side of the border. This agreement is not recognized by South Korea, which has since demanded Noktundo's return to Korean jurisdiction (ostensibly this would be North Korean jurisdiction, with the expectation of unified Korean control after an eventual Korean reunification).

Original copies
An original copy of the convention is located in the National Palace Museum in Taiwan.

See also
 Second Convention of Peking
 History of Hong Kong
 Western imperialism in Asia

References

Further reading
 Cole, Herbert M. "Origins of the French Protectorate over Catholic Missions in China." American Journal of International Law 34.3 (1940): 473–491.

External links

A timeline of the history of Hong Kong from 1840 to 1999
 Full text of the Convention of Peking between China and the United Kingdom 
 Full text of the Convention of Peking between China and France 
 Full text of the Convention of Peking between China and Russia 

19th century in the Russian Empire
History of Manchuria
Peking
Peking
Kowloon
Peking
1860 in France
1860 in the United Kingdom
1860 in China
China–Russian Empire relations
Opium Wars
Boundary treaties
1860 treaties
Peking
Peking
Peking
China–France relations
China–United Kingdom relations
October 1860 events
History of Zhangjiakou